The 2022 Chicago Cubs season was the 151st season of the Chicago Cubs franchise, the 147th in the National League, and the Cubs' 107th season at Wrigley Field. The Cubs were managed by David Ross, in his third year as Cubs manager as members of Major League Baseball's National League Central division.  

The Cubs began the season at home against the Milwaukee Brewers on April 1 and finished the season on the road against the Cincinnati Reds on October 5. With their loss on September 17, the Cubs were officially eliminated from playoff contention for the second consecutive season. The Cubs finished the season 74–88, 19 games out of first place.

Previous season 
The Cubs finished the 2021 season 71–91 to finish in fourth place in the Central Division failing to make the playoffs for only the second time since 2014. The season also marked the first time since 2014 that the Cubs finished with a losing record and the first time since 2013 that the Cubs lost at least 91 games.

Roster changes 
The season marked the end of an era as the Cubs traded core members of the team that won the 2016 World Series (Javier Báez, Kris Bryant, and Anthony Rizzo) at the trade deadline in 2021. The final core member, Willson Contreras, signed a five-year, $87.5 million contract with the St. Louis Cardinals after the 2022 season concluded.

Offseason

Front office changes 
On October 15, 2021, the Cubs announced they had hired the assistant general manager for the Cleveland Guardians, Carter Hawkins, as the team's new general manager. On October 25, the club announced they had hired Ehsan Bokhari as assistant GM.

Coaching changes 
On March 11, 2022, the Cubs announced that manager David Ross had signed a three-year contract extension through the 2024 season with an option for 2025.

Hitting coach Anthony Iapoce was fired following the season. Shortly thereafter, the team hired Tampa Bay minor league hitting coordinator Greg Brown as the new hitting coach. On November 15, 2021, the Cubs announced they had parted ways with associate pitching, catching, and strategy coach Mike Borzello. Additionally, assistant director Brad Mills departed the team. The team further named Daniel Moskos as the new assistant pitching coach. Johnny Washington was later named assistant hitting coach.

Lockout 

The expiration of the league's collective bargaining agreement (CBA) with the Major League Baseball Players Association occurred on December 1, 2021 with no new agreement in place. As a result, the team owners voted unanimously to lockout the players stopping all free agency and trades.  

The Cubs officially signed three players, including free agent pitcher Marcus Stroman, prior to the lockout being put in place. 

On March 10, 2022, the MLB and MLBPA agreed to a new collective bargaining agreement, thus ending the lockout. Although MLB previously announced that several series would be canceled due to the lockout, the agreement provides for a 162-game season, with originally canceled games to be made up via doubleheaders.

Rule changes 
Pursuant to the new CBA, several new rules were instituted for the 2022 season:

 the National League will adopt the designated hitter;
 a draft lottery will be implemented;
 the postseason will expand from 10 to 12 teams; and 
 advertising patches will appear on player uniforms and helmets for the first time.
Due to the shortened season as a result of the lockout, MLB instituted temporary rules for the 2022 season including increasing roster size to 28 through May 1 and starting extra innings with a runner on second base.

Transactions

October 2021 

Source

November 2021 

Source

December 2021 

Source

January 2022 

Source

February 2022 

Source

March 2022 

Source

April 2022 

Source

Regular season

Game log
Due to the 2021–22 Major League Baseball lockout, several games were initially canceled, but it was later announced that the games would be made up both through the use of doubleheaders and by delaying the end date of the regular season from October 2 to October 5.

|-style=background:#bfb;"
| 1 || April 7 || Brewers || 5–4 || Martin (1–0) || Ashby (0–1) || Robertson (1) || 35,112 || 1–0 || W1
|-style=background:#bbb;"
| — || April 8 || Brewers || colspan=7| Postponed (inclement weather); Makeup: May 30
|-style=background:#bfb;"
| 2 || April 9 || Brewers || 9–0 || Steele (1–0) || Woodruff (0–1) || — || 30,369 || 2–0 || W2
|-style=background:#fbb;"
| 3 || April 10 || Brewers || 4–5 || Boxberger (1–0) || Norris (0–1) || Hader (1) || 32,858 || 2–1 || L1
|-style=background:#bfb;"
| 4 || April 12 || @ Pirates || 2–1 || Smyly (1–0) || Quintana (0–1) || Robertson (2) || 34,458 || 3–1 || W1
|-style=background:#fbb;"
| 5 || April 13 || @ Pirates || 2–6 || Peters (1–0) || Hendricks (0–1) || Crowe (1) || 9,122 || 3–2 || L1
|-style=background:#bfb;"
| 6 || April 14 || @ Rockies || 5–2 || Thompson (1–0) || Freeland (0–2) || Givens (1) || 24,444 || 4–2 || W1
|-style=background:#fbb;"
| 7 || April 15 || @ Rockies || 5–6 || Blach (1–0) || Stroman (0–1) || Bard (3) || 35,450 || 4–3 || L1
|-style=background:#fbb;"
| 8 || April 16 || @ Rockies || 6–9 || Senzatela (1–0) || Leiter Jr. (0–1) || Bard (4) || 37,476 || 4–4 || L2
|-style=background:#bfb;"
| 9 || April 17 || @ Rockies || 6–4 || Wick (1–0) || Gomber (0–1) || Robertson (3) || 36,391 || 5–4 || W1
|-style=background:#bfb;"
| 10 || April 18 || Rays || 4–2 || Thompson (2–0) || Adam (0–1) || Robertson (4) || 26,615 || 6–4 || W2
|-style=background:#fbb;"
| 11 || April 19 || Rays || 5–6 || Fleming (2–1) || Steele (1–1) || Kittredge (2) || 26,568 || 6–5 || L1
|-style=background:#fbb;"
| 12 || April 20 || Rays || 2–8  || Beeks (1–0) || Stroman (0–2) || — || 26,167 || 6–6 || L2
|-style=background:#fbb;"
| 13 || April 21 || Pirates || 3–4 || Crowe (1–0) || Roberts (0–1) || Stratton (1) || 32,341 || 6–7 || L3
|-style=background:#fbb;"
| 14 || April 22 || Pirates || 2–4 || De Jong (1–0) || Smyly (1–1) || Stratton (2) || 25,005 || 6–8 || L4
|-style=background:#bfb;"
| 15 || April 23 || Pirates || 21–0 || Hendricks (1–1) || Thompson (0–2) || — || 39,917 || 7–8 || W1
|-style=background:#fbb;"
| 16 || April 24 || Pirates || 3–4 || Peters (3–0) || Steele (1–2) || Bednar (2) || 28,387 || 7–9 || L1
|-style=background:#fbb;"
| 17 || April 26 || @ Braves || 1–3 || Fried (2–2) || Stroman (0–3) || Jansen (5) || 31,990 || 7–10 || L2
|-style=background:#bfb;"
| 18 || April 27 || @ Braves || 6–3  || Robertson (1–0) || Matzek (0–1) || Wick (1) || 30,362 || 8–10 || W1
|-style=background:#fbb;"
| 19 || April 28 || @ Braves || 1–5 || Wright (3–0) || Smyly (1–2) || — || 34,183 || 8–11 || L1
|-style=background:#fbb;"
| 20 || April 29 || @ Brewers || 1–11 || Houser (2–2) || Hendricks (1–2) || — || 29,062 || 8–12 || L2
|-style=background:#fbb;"
| 21 || April 30 || @ Brewers || 1–9 || Lauer (2–0) || Steele (1–3) || — || 37,263 || 8–13 || L3
|-

|-style=background:#bfb;"
| 22 || May 1 || @ Brewers || 2–0 || Stroman (1–3) || Burnes (1–1) || Robertson (5) || 35,137 || 9–13 || W1
|-style=background:#fbb;"
| 23 || May 3 || White Sox || 1–3 || López (3–0) || Effross (0–1) || Hendriks (6) || 34,206 || 9–14 || L1
|-style=background:#fbb;"
| 24 || May 4 || White Sox || 3–4 || Giolito (1–1) || Hendricks (1–3) || Hendriks (7) || 36,755 || 9–15 || L2
|-style=background:#bbb;"
| — || May 6 || Dodgers || colspan=7| Postponed (inclement weather); Makeup: May 7
|-style=background:#fbb;"
| 25 || May 7  || Dodgers || 0–7 || Kershaw (4–0) || Smyly (1–3) || — || 37,594 || 9–16 || L3
|-style=background:#fbb;"
| 26 || May 7  || Dodgers || 2–6 || Anderson (3–0) || Norris (0–2) || — || 31,520 || 9–17 || L4
|-style=background:#fbb;"
| 27 || May 8 || Dodgers || 1–7 || Buehler (4–1) || Steele (1–4) || — || 31,424 || 9–18 || L5
|-style=background:#bfb;"
| 28 || May 9 || @ Padres || 6–0 || Hendricks (2–3) || Gore (2–1) || — || 41,595 || 10–18 || W1
|-style=background:#fbb;"
| 29 || May 10 || @ Padres || 4–5 || Wilson (3–0) || Gsellman (0–1) || Rogers (12) || 31,047 || 10–19 || L1
|-style=background:#bfb;"
| 30 || May 11 || @ Padres || 7–5 || Givens (2–0) || García (0–2) || Wick (2) || 29,344 || 11–19 || W1
|-style=background:#fbb;"
| 31 || May 13 || @ Diamondbacks || 3–4 || Davies (2–1) || Smyly (1–4) || Melancon (7) || 21,765 || 11–20 || L1
|-style=background:#bfb;"
| 32 || May 14 || @ Diamondbacks || 4–1 || Givens (3–0) || Melancon (0–5) || Wick (3) || 25,169 || 12–20 || W1
|-style=background:#bfb;"
| 33 || May 15 || @ Diamondbacks || 3–2 || Effross (1–1) || Kennedy (2–2) || Wick (4) || 23,309 || 13–20 || W2
|-style=background:#bfb;"
| 34 || May 16 || Pirates || 9–0 || Miley (1–0) || Peters (3–2) || — || 31,119 || 14–20 || W3
|-style=background:#bfb;"
| 35 || May 17 || Pirates || 7–0 || Thompson (3–0) || Brubaker (0–4) || — || 30,478 || 15–20 || W4
|-style=background:#fbb;"
| 36 || May 18 || Pirates || 2–3 || Keller (1–5) || Smyly (1–5) || Bednar (8) || 31,631 || 15–21 || L1
|-style=background:#fbb;"
| 37 || May 19 || Diamondbacks || 1–3 || Gallen (3–0) || Stroman (1–4) || Melancon (8) || 32,631 || 15–22 || L2
|-style=background:#fbb;"
| 38 || May 20 || Diamondbacks || 6–10 || Castellanos (3–1) || Hendricks (2–4) || — || 31,235 || 15–23 || L3
|-style=background:#fbb;"
| 39 || May 21 || Diamondbacks || 6–7  || Kennedy (3–2) || Wick (1–1) || Melancon (9) || 32,269 || 15–24 || L4
|-style=background:#bfb;"
| 40 || May 22 || Diamondbacks || 5–4 || Thompson (4–0) || Kennedy (3–3) || — || 32,606 || 16–24 || W1
|-style=background:#bfb;"
| 41 || May 23 || @ Reds || 7–4 || Smyly (2–5) || Gutiérrez (0–6) || Robertson (6) || 12,029 || 17–24 || W2
|-style=background:#bfb;"
| 42 || May 24 || @ Reds || 11–4 || Stroman (2–4) || Mahle (2–5) || Gsellman (1) || 14,386 || 18–24 || W3
|-style=background:#fbb;"
| 43 || May 25 || @ Reds || 3–4 || Castillo (1–2) || Hendricks (2–5) || Strickland (1) || 11,417 || 18–25 || L1
|-style=background:#fbb;"
| 44 || May 26 || @ Reds || 5–20 || Greene (2–6) || Steele (1–5) || — || 13,578 || 18–26 || L2
|-style=background:#bfb;"
| 45 || May 28 || @ White Sox || 5–1 || Thompson (5–2) || Cueto (0–1) || — || 37,820 || 19–26 || W1
|-style=background:#fbb;"
| 46 || May 29 || @ White Sox || 4–5  || Foster (1–0) || Gsellman (0–2) || — || 38,080 || 19–27 || L1
|-style=background:#fbb;"
| 47 || May 30  || Brewers || 6–7 || Sánchez (1–1) || Norris (0–3) || Hader (17) || 39,305 || 19–28 || L2
|-style=background:#fbb;"
| 48 || May 30  || Brewers || 1–3 || Ashby (1–3) || Espinoza (0–1) || Hader (18) || 28,620 || 19–29 || L3
|-style=background:#bfb;"
| 49 || May 31 || Brewers || 8–7 || Givens (4–0) || Boxberger (1–1) || Robertson (7) || 30,596 || 20–29 || W1
|-

|-style=background:#bfb;"
| 50 || June 1 || Brewers || 4–3  || Leiter Jr. (1–1) || Milner (2–1) || — || 33,398 || 21–29 || W2
|-style=background:#bfb;"
| 51 || June 2 || Cardinals || 7–5 || Thompson (6–0) || Liberatore (1–1) || — || 30,466 || 22–29 || W3
|-style=background:#fbb;"
| 52 || June 3 || Cardinals || 5–14 || Mikolas (4–3) || Stroman (2–5) || Thompson (1) || 32,482 || 22–30 || L1
|-style=background:#bfb;"
| 53 || June 4  || Cardinals || 6–1 || Swarmer (1–0) || Oviedo (0–1) || — || 32,792 || 23–30 || W1
|-style=background:#fbb;"
| 54 || June 4  || Cardinals || 4–7  || Gallegos (1–2) || Rucker (0–1) || — || 31,673 || 23–31 || L1
|-style=background:#fbb;"
| 55 || June 5 || Cardinals || 3–5  || Cabrera (3–1) || Norris (0–4) || — || 31,424 || 23–32 || L2
|-style=background:#fbb;"
| 56 || June 7 || @ Orioles || 3–9 || Baker (2–3) || Thompson (6–1) || — || 11,509 || 23–33 || L3
|-style=background:#bbb;"
| — || June 8 || @ Orioles || colspan=8| Postponed (inclement weather); Makeup: August 18
|-style=background:#fbb;"
| 57 || June 10 || @ Yankees || 1–2  || Marinaccio (1–0) || Mills (0–1) || — || 43,446 || 23–34 || L4
|-style=background:#fbb;"
| 58 || June 11 || @ Yankees || 0–8 || Montgomery (2–1) || Swarmer (1–1) || — || 38,043 || 23–35 || L5
|-style=background:#fbb;"
| 59 || June 12 || @ Yankees || 4–18 || Taillon (7–1) || Thompson (6–2) || Bañuelos (1) || 39,114 || 23–36 || L6
|-style=background:#fbb;"
| 60 || June 13 || Padres || 1–4 || Darvish (6–3) || Wick (1–2) || Rogers (19) || 31,629 || 23–37 || L7
|-style=background:#fbb;"
| 61 || June 14 || Padres || 5–12 || Tyler (1–0) || Effross (1–2) || — || 29,233 || 23–38 || L8
|-style=background:#fbb;"
| 62 || June 15 || Padres || 5–19 || Stammen (1–0) || Kilian (0–1) || — || 31,570 || 23–39 || L9
|-style=background:#fbb;"
| 63 || June 16 || Padres || 4–6 || Musgrove (8–0) || Swarmer (1–2) || Rogers (20) || 30,096 || 23–40 || L10
|-style=background:#bfb;"
| 64 || June 17 || Braves || 1–0 || Martin (1–0) || Minter (2–1) || Robertson (8) || 35,676 || 24–40 || W1
|-style=background:#bfb;"
| 65 || June 18 || Braves || 6–3 || Steele (2–5) || Wright (7–4) || — || 40,755 || 25–40 || W2
|-style=background:#fbb;"
| 66 || June 19 || Braves || 0–6 || Anderson (6–3) || Hendricks (2–6) || — || 40,369 || 25–41 || L1
|-style=background:#fbb;"
| 67 || June 20 || @ Pirates || 1–12 || Brubaker (1–7) || Kilian (0–2) || — || 11,312 || 25–42 || L2
|-style=background:#fbb;"
| 68 || June 21 || @ Pirates || 1–7 || Contreras (2–1) || Swarmer (1–3) || — || 11,254 || 25–43 || L3
|-style=background:#bfb;"
| 69 || June 22 || @ Pirates || 14–5 || Thompson (7–2) || Eickhoff (0–1) || — || 14,083 || 26–43 || W1
|-style=background:#fbb;"
| 70 || June 23 || @ Pirates || 7–8  || Stratton (4–3) || Effross (1–3) || — || 14,529 || 26–44 || L1
|-style=background:#bfb;"
| 71 || June 24 || @ Cardinals || 3–0 || Hendricks (3–6) || Pallante (2–3) || Robertson (9) || 46,524 || 27–44 || W1
|-style=background:#fbb;"
| 72 || June 25 || @ Cardinals || 3–5 || Helsley (3–0) || Leiter Jr. (1–2) || — || 45,159 || 27–45 || L1
|-style=background:#bfb;"
| 73 || June 26 || @ Cardinals || 6–5  || Robertson (2–0) || Thompson (1–1) || — || 44,824 || 28–45 || W1
|-style=background:#fbb;"
| 74 || June 28 || Reds || 3–5 || Castillo (3–4) || Thompson (7–3) || Strickland (4) || 32,732 || 28–46 || L1
|-style=background:#bfb;"
| 75 || June 29 || Reds || 8–3 || Steeele (3–5) || Greene (3–9) || — || 28,987 || 29–46 || W1
|-style=background:#bfb;"
| 76 || June 30 || Reds || 15–7 || Hendricks (4–6) || Ashcraft (4–2) || — || 32,318 || 30–46 || W2
|-

|-style=background:#bfb;"
| 77 || July 1 || Red Sox || 6–5 || Hughes (1–0) || Robles (1–3) || Robertson (10) || 34,931 || 31–46 || W3
|-style=background:#bfb;"
| 78 || July 2 || Red Sox || 3–1 || Leiter Jr. (2–2) || Winckowski (3–2) || Robertson (11) || 40,298 || 32–46 || W4
|-style=background:#fbb;"
| 79 || July 3 || Red Sox || 2–4  || Diekman (3–0) || Wick (1–3) || — || 40,185 || 32–47 || L1
|-style=background:#fbb;"
| 80 || July 4 || @ Brewers || 2–5  || Boxberger (3–1) || Effross (1–4) || — || 41,981 || 32–48 || L2
|-style=background:#bfb;"
| 81 || July 5 || @ Brewers || 8–3 || Swarmer (2–3) || Alexander (2–1) || — || 30,561 || 33–48 || W1
|-style=background:#bfb;"
| 82 || July 6 || @ Brewers || 2–1 || Givens (5–0) || Hader (0–2) || Robertson (12) || 32,696 || 34–48 || W2
|-style=background:#fbb;"
| 83 || July 7 || @ Dodgers || 3–5 || Gonsolin (11–0) || Leiter Jr. (2–3) || Vesia (1) || 52,072 || 34–49 || L1
|-style=background:#fbb;"
| 84 || July 8 || @ Dodgers || 3–4  || Phillips (3–3) || Wick (1–4) || — || 44,158 || 34–50 || L2
|-style=background:#fbb;"
| 85 || July 9 || @ Dodgers || 2–4 || Kershaw (6–2) || Wick (1–5) || Kimbrel (15) || 45,198 || 34–51 || L3
|-style=background:#fbb;"
| 86 || July 10 || @ Dodgers || 9–11 || Bickford (1–1) || Leiter Jr. (2–4) || Graterol (3) || 41,824 || 34–52 || L4
|-style=background:#fbb;"
| 87 || July 12 || Orioles || 2–4 || Lyles (6–7) || Sampson (0–1) || López (17) || 31,079 || 34–53 || L5
|-style=background:#fbb;"
| 88 || July 13 || Orioles || 1–7 || Watkins (3–1) || Steele (3–6) || — || 29,529 || 34–54 || L6
|-style=background:#fbb;"
| 89 || July 14 || Mets || 0–8 || Carrasco (10–4) || Thompson (7–4) || Williams (1) || 34,051 || 34–55 || L7
|- style=background:#bbb;"
| — || July 15 || Mets || colspan=7| Postponed (inclement weather); Makeup: July 16
|-style=background:#fbb;"
| 90 || July 16 (1) || Mets || 1–2  || Ottavino (4–2) || Givens (5–1) || Díaz (20) || 39,219 || 34–56 || L8
|-style=background:#fbb;"
| 91 || July 16 (2) || Mets || 3–4  || López (1–0) || Givens (5–2) || — || 34,366 || 34–57 || L9
|-style=background:#bfb;"
| 92 || July 17 || Mets || 3–2 || Wick (2–5) || Smith (1–3) || Robertson (13) || 34,424 || 35–57 || W1
|-style="text-align:center; background:#bff;
| ASG || July 19 || AL @ NL || 3–2 || Valdez (1–0) || Gonsolin (0–1) || Clase (1) || 52,518 || N/A || N/A
|-style=background:#bfb;"
| 93 || July 22 || @ Phillies || 15–2 || Steele (4–6) || Gibson (5–4) || — || 27,775 || 36–57 || W2
|-style=background:#bfb;"
| 94 || July 23 || @ Phillies || 6–2  || Robertson (3–0) || Alvarado (3–2) || — || 38,542 || 37–57 || W3
|-style=background:#bfb;"
| 95 || July 24 || @ Phillies || 4–3 || Smyly (3–5) || Falter (0–3) || Robertson (14) || 29,079 || 38–57 || W4
|-style=background:#bfb;"
| 96 || July 25 || Pirates || 3–2 || Givens (6–2) || De Los Santos (0–2) || Effross (1) || 37,342 || 39–57 || W5
|-style=background:#bfb;"
| 97 || July 26 || Pirates || 4–2 || Thompson (8–4) || Wilson (1–6) || Givens (2) || 30,978 || 40–57 || W6
|-style=background:#fbb;"
| 98 || July 28 || @ Giants || 2–4 || Wood (7–8) || Steele (4–7) || Doval (13) || 32,259 || 40–58 || L1
|-style=background:#bfb;"
| 99 || July 29 || @ Giants || 4–2 || Stroman (3–5) || Cobb (3–5) || — || 30,376 || 41–58 || W1
|-style=background:#fbb;"
| 100 || July 30 || @ Giants || 4–5 || Rogers (2–3) || Smyly (3–6) || Leone (3) || 40,971 || 41–59 || L1
|-style=background:#fbb;"
| 101 || July 31 || @ Giants || 0–4 || Rodón (9–6) || Sampson (0–2) || — || 33,622 || 41–60 || L2
|-

|-style=background:#fbb;"
| 102 || August 2 || @ Cardinals || 0–6 ||  Wainwright (8–8) ||  Thompson (8–5) || — || 44,344 || 41–61 || L3
|-style=background:#bbb;" 
| — || August 3 || @ Cardinals || colspan=8| Postponed (inclement weather); Makeup: August 4
|-style=background:#fbb;"
| 103 || August 4  || @ Cardinals || 3–4 || Helsley (6–1) || Uelmen (0–1) || — || 41,734 || 41–62 || L4
|-style=background:#fbb;"
| 104 || August 4  || @ Cardinals || 2–7 || Hicks (3–5) || Castro (0–1) || — || 44,669 || 41–63 || L5
|-style=background:#bfb;"
| 105 || August 5 || Marlins || 2–1 || Wick (3–5) || Floro (0–1) || — || 35,689 || 42–63 || W1
|-style=background:#bfb;"
| 106 || August 6 || Marlins || 4–0 || Smyly (4–6) || López (7–7) || || 36,787 || 43–63 || W2
|-style=background:#fbb;"
| 107 || August 7 || Marlins || 0–3 || Luzardo (3–4) || Sampson (0–3) ||  Scott (15) || 30,177 || 43–64 || L1
|-style=background:#bfb;"
| 108 || August 8 || Nationals || 6–3 || Thompson (9–5) || Sánchez (0–5) || Wick (5) || 30,904 || 44–64 || W1
|-style=background:#fbb;"
| 109 || August 9 || Nationals || 5–6 || Finnegan (3–2) || Leiter Jr. (2–5) || Edwards Jr. (1) || 37,193 || 44–65 || L1
|-style=background:#bfb;"
| 110 || August 10 || Nationals || 4–2 || Rucker (1–1) || Cishek (1–3) || Wick (6) || 29,019 || 45–65 || W1
|-style=background:#bfb;"
| 111 || August 11 || vs. Reds (Field of Dreams game) || 4–2 || Smyly (5–6) || Lodolo (3–4) || Wick (7) || 7,823 || 46–65 || W2
|-style=background:#bfb;"
| 112 || August 13 || @ Reds || 7–2 || Newcomb (1–0) || Ashcraft (5–3) || — || 33,301 || 47–65 || W3
|-style=background:#fbb;"
| 113 || August 14 || @ Reds || 5–8 || Kuhnel (2–1) || Espinoza (0–2) || Díaz (5) || 23,959 || 47–66 || L1
|-style=background:#fbb;"
| 114 || August 15 || @ Nationals || 4–5 || Edwards Jr. (4–3) || Hughes (1–1) || Finnegan (5) || 25,467 || 47–67 || L2
|-style=background:#bfb;"
| 115 || August 16 || @ Nationals || 7–5  || Hughes (2–1) || Arano (1–1) || Leiter Jr. (1) || 26,362 || 48–67 || W1
|-style=background:#bfb;"
| 116 || August 17 || @ Nationals || 3–2 || Uelmen (1–1) || McGee (1–3) || Wick (8) || 28,302 || 49–67 || W2
|-style=background:#bfb;"
| 117 || August 18 || @ Orioles || 3–2 || Sampson (1–3) || Watkins (4–3) || Hughes (1) || 19,454 || 50–67 || W3
|-style=background:#bfb;"
| 118 || August 19 || Brewers || 8–7 || Rucker (2–1) || Milner (3–2) || Hughes (2) || 39,962 || 51–67 || W4
|-style=background:#bfb;"
| 119 || August 20 || Brewers || 6–5  || Uelmen (2–1) || Strzelecki (1–1) || — || 35,994 || 52–67 || W5
|-style=background:#fbb;"
| 120 || August 21 || Brewers || 2–5 || Suter (5–3) || Wick (3–6) || Rogers (29) || 34,525 || 52–68 || L1
|-style=background:#fbb;"
| 121 || August 22 || Cardinals || 0–1 || Montgomery (7–3) || Smyly (5–7) || — || 29,719 || 52–69 || L2
|-style=background:#bfb;"
| 122 || August 23  || Cardinals || 2–0 || Rucker (3–1) || Wainwright (9–9) || Hughes (3) || 27,273 || 53–69 || W1
|-style=background:#fbb;"
| 123 || August 23  || Cardinals || 3–13 || Woodford (3–0) || Sampson (1–4) || — || 28,163 || 53–70 || L1
|-style=background:#bfb;"
| 124 || August 24 || Cardinals || 7–1 || Wick (4–6) || Mikolas (10–10) || — || 32,012 || 54–70 || W1
|-style=background:#fbb;"
| 125 || August 25 || Cardinals || 3–8 || Hudson (7–6) || Stroman (3–6) || — || 28,803 || 54–71 || L1
|-style=background:#bfb;"
| 126 || August 26 || @ Brewers || 4–3  || Newcomb (2–0) || Williams (4–3) || Rodríguez (1) || 33,549 || 55–71 || W1
|-style=background:#fbb;"
| 127 || August 27 || @ Brewers || 0–7 || Rogers (2–6) || Wick (4–7) || — || 40,901 || 55–72 || L1
|-style=background:#fbb;"
| 128 || August 28 || @ Brewers || 7–9 || Lauer (10–5) || Newcomb (2–1) || Williams (9) || 39,035 || 55–73 || L2
|-style=background:#fbb;"
| 129 || August 29 || @ Blue Jays || 4–5  || García (3–4) || Leiter Jr. (2–6) || — || 26,473 || 55–74 || L3
|-style=background:#fbb;"
| 130 || August 30 || @ Blue Jays || 3–5 || Gausman (10–9) || Little (0–1) || Romano (28) || 33,759 || 55–75 || L4
|-style=background:#bfb;"
| 131 || August 31 || @ Blue Jays || 7–5 || Rodríguez (1–0) || White (1–5) || Wick (9) || 28,572 || 56–75 || W1
|-

|-style=background:#fbb;"
| 132 || September 2 || @ Cardinals || 0–8 || Montgomery (8–3) || Sampson (1–5) || — || 44,491 || 56–76 || L1
|-style=background:#fbb;"
| 133 || September 3 || @ Cardinals || 4–8 || Wainwright (10–9) || Smyly (5–8) || — || 47,816 || 56–77 || L2
|-style=background:#fbb;"
| 134 || September 4 || @ Cardinals || 0–2 || Mikolas (11–10) || Hughes (2–2) || Helsley (13) || 46,642 || 56–78 || L3
|-style=background:#bfb;"
| 135 || September 6 || Reds || 9–3 || Wesneski (1–0) || Gibaut (1–1) || — || 27,600 || 57–78 || W1
|-style=background:#fbb;"
| 136 || September 7 || Reds || 1–7 || Minor (4–10) || Assad (0–1) || — || 27,945 || 57–79 || L1
|-style=background:#fbb;"
| 137 || September 8 || Reds || 3–4 || Díaz (6–2) || Leiter Jr. (2–7) || Gibaut (1) || 23,910 || 57–80 || L2
|-style=background:#bfb;"
| 138 || September 9 || Giants || 4–2 || Smyly (6–8) || Rodón (12–8) || Hughes (4) || 31,309 || 58–80 || W1
|-style=background:#fbb;"
| 139 || September 10 || Giants || 2–5 || Webb (13–8) || Stroman (3–7) || Doval (21) || 40,086 || 58–81 || L1
|-style=background:#fbb;"
| 140 || September 11 || Giants || 2–4 || Littell (3–3) || Wesneski (1–1) || Doval (22) || 30,004 || 58–82 || L2
|-style=background:#bfb;"
| 141 || September 12 || @ Mets || 5–2 || Assad (1–1) || Bassitt (13–8) || Hughes (5) || 28,081 || 59–82 || W1
|-style=background:#bfb;"
| 142 || September 13 || @ Mets || 4–1 || Sampson (2–5) || deGrom (5–2) || — || 26,435 || 60–82 || W2
|-style=background:#bfb;"
| 143 || September 14 || @ Mets || 6–3 || Smyly (7–8) || Peterson (7–5) || Leiter Jr. (2) || 28,522 || 61–82 || W3
|-style=background:#bfb;"
| 144 || September 16 || Rockies || 2–1 || Stroman (4–7) || Márquez (8–11) || Rodríguez (2) || 31,775 || 62–82 || W4
|-style=background:#fbb;"
| 145 || September 17 || Rockies || 1–3 || Estévez (4–4) || Alzolay (0–1) || Bard (31) || 34,530 || 62–83 || L1
|-style=background:#fbb;"
| 146 || September 18 || Rockies || 3–4 || Feltner (3–8) || Assad (1–2) || Bard (32) || 35,627 || 62–84 || L2
|-style=background:#fbb;"
| 147 || September 19 || @ Marlins || 3–10 || Cabrera (6–3) || Miley (1–1) || — || 8,315 || 62–85 || L3
|-style=background:#bfb;"
| 148 || September 20 || @ Marlins || 2–1 || Alzolay (1–1) || Okert (5–4) || Hughes (6) || 7,972 || 63–85 || W1
|-style=background:#bfb;"
| 149 || September 21 || @ Marlins || 4–3 || Thompson (10–5) || Okert (5–5) || — || 8,753 || 64–85 || W2
|-style=background:#bfb;"
| 150 || September 22 || @ Pirates || 3–2 || Wesneski (2–1) || Keller (5–12) || Leiter Jr. (3) || 9,166 || 65–85 || W3
|-style=background:#bfb;"
| 151 || September 23 || @ Pirates || 6–5 || Rodríguez (2–0) || Ramírez (1–1) || Uelmen (1) || 11,987 || 66–85 || W4
|-style=background:#fbb;"
| 152 || September 24 || @ Pirates || 0–6 || Oviedo (4–2) || Miley (1–2) || — || 17,273 || 66–86 || L1
|-style=background:#bfb;"
| 153 || September 25 || @ Pirates || 8–3 || Sampson (3–5) || Ortiz (0–1) || Hughes (7) || 16,192 || 67–86 || W1
|-style=background:#bfb;"
| 154 || September 27 || Phillies || 2–1 || Stroman (5–7) || Brogdon (2–2) || Rodríguez (3) || 32,069 || 68–86 || W2
|-style=background:#bfb;"
| 155 || September 28 || Phillies || 4–2 || Wesneski (3–1) || Nola (10–13) || Rodríguez (4) || 29,368 || 69–86 || W3
|-style=background:#bfb;"
| 156 || September 29 || Phillies || 2–0 || Assad (2–2) || Suárez (10–6) || Thompson (1) || 23,425 || 70–86 || W4
|-style=background:#bfb;"
| 157 || September 30 || Reds || 6–1 || Sampson (4–5) || Ashcraft (5–5) || — || 24,297 || 71–86 || W5
|-

|-style=background:#bfb;"
| 158 || October 1 || Reds || 2–1 || Miley (2–2) || Law (2–3) || Hughes (8) || 31,256 || 72–86 || W6
|-style=background:#bfb;"
| 159 || October 2 || Reds || 8–1 || Stroman (6–7) || Anderson (2–4) || — || 30,029 || 73–86 || W7
|-style=background:#fbb;"
| 160 || October 3 || @ Reds || 1–3 || Greene (5–13) || Wesneski (3–2) || Díaz (10) || 11,291 || 73–87 || L1
|-style=background:#fbb;"
| 161 || October 4 || @ Reds || 2–3 || Díaz (7–3) || Hughes (2–3) || — || 13,738 || 73–88 || L2
|-style=background:#bfb;"
| 162 || October 5 || @ Reds || 15–2 || Alzolay (2–1) || Ashcraft (5–6) || — || 12,437 || 74–88 || W1
|-

|- style="text-align:center;"
| Legend:       = Win       = Loss       = PostponementBold = Cubs team member

Season standings

National League Central

National League Wild Card

Record vs. opponents

Opening Day starters 
Thursday, April 7, 2022 vs. Milwaukee Brewers at Wrigley Field

Season summary

April 

 April 2 – The Cubs announced that Kyle Hendricks would be the Opening Day starting pitcher for the third consecutive season.
 April 7 – The Cubs opened the season at Wrigley Field against division rival Milwaukee. Ian Happ had three hits and drove in two runs while Nico Hoerner hit his first home run since 2019 as the Cubs beat the Brewers 5–4. Kyle Hendricks allowed one run in 5.1 innings while David Robertson got the save. 
 April 9 –  Following a rain out the day before, the Cubs faced the Brewers in the second game of the series. Justin Steele pitched five scoreless innings and three relievers held the Brewers hitless as the Cubs won 9–0. New Cub Seiya Suzuki drove in three runs while Happ had two hits and two RBI in the win. The Brewers hit three Cub batters in the game leading to Cub pitcher Keegan Thompson retaliating and hitting Andrew McCutchen. This led to the benches clearing and Thompson getting ejected. 
 April 10 – In the final game of the series, new Cub Marcus Stroman pitched five innings and allowed only one run. The Cubs scored three runs in the first on a three-run SeiyaSuzuki home run. However, the Cub bullpen struggled, giving up a 3–1 lead and the go-ahead run after the Cubs had tied the game at four. The 5–4 loss marked the Cubs' first loss of the season. 
 April 12 – After an off day, the Cubs traveled to face the Pirates in Pittsburgh. Seiya Suzuki hit two solo home runs while Drew Smyly continued the Cubs' starting pitchers success, allowing no runs in five innings. The Pirates managed only one run as the Cubs held on for the 2–1 win. 
 April 13 – The Cubs' string of good starting pitching ended as Kyle Hendricks gave up six runs in 3.2 innings. Willson Contreras homered and Seiya Suzuki drove in a run, but the Cubs could do nothing further as they lost to the Pirates 6–2. 
 April 14 – The Cubs traveled to Denver to face the Rockies for a four-game series. Seiya Suzuki drove in a run with an RBI double to extend his hit streak to six games while Frank Schwindel homered and drove in two runs as the Cubs beat the Rockies 5–2. Justin Steele allowed two runs in 4.1 innings, but Keegan Thompson pitched 3.1 scoreless innings of relief to earn the win. Mychal Givens pitched the ninth to earn his first save in the win. 
 April 15 – In game two of the series against the Rockies, the Cubs jumped to an early 3–0 lead on RBI singles by Alfonso Rivas and Rafael Ortega. Willson Contreras also drove in a run on a double. However, Marcus Stroman gave up five runs in the fourth and the Rockies went on to win 6–5. 
 April 16 – Needing a fifth starter for the first time on the season, Mark Leiter Jr. was called up for the start and surrendered seven runs in 3.1 innings as the Cubs fell behind big to the Rockies. Jonathan Villar drove in three runs as the Cubs narrowed the lead with four runs in the seventh, but it was not enough as the Cubs lost 9–6 to drop to .500 for the first time on the season. 
 April 17 – In the finale of the four-game series against the Rockies, Willson Contreras and Seiya Suzuki homered for the Cubs while Nico Hoerner drove in two as the Cubs won the game 6–4. Drew Smyly pitched well in 4.2 innings, allowing no runs in the win. 
 April 18 – The Cubs returned to Wrigley to face the Tampa Bay Rays. Kyle Hendricks allowed two runs in 4.1 innings while Keegan Thompson pitched 3.2 scoreless innings. Patrick Wisdom hit a two-run homer in the second, his first of the season, and Frank Schwindel also homered as the Cubs won 4–2. Seiya Suzuki added two hits and extended his hitting streak to nine games in the win. David Robertson earned his fourth save of the season. 
 April 19 – Justin Steele gave up four runs in 2.2 innings as the Cubs fell behind 4–0. However, they rallied behind Patrick Wisdom's second home run of the year, a pinch-hit homer in the fourth, to draw within one run. Cub reliever Chris Martin gave up two runs in the seventh meaning Nico Hoerner's run-scoring triple in the seventh left the Cubs behind by two. Hoerner would score on a wild pitch, but the Cubs could muster no more, losing 6–5 to the Rays. 
 April 20 – In the final game of the series against the Rays, Marcus Stroman gave up eight runs in 4.1 innings as the Cubs lost 8–2 in a game shortened to six innings due to rain. Seiya Suzuki's hitting streak ended at nine games, but he did extend his on-base streak to 12 (in his first 12 games in MLB).
 April 21 – The Cubs took an early 3–0 lead against the Pirates at Wrigley, but Mark Leiter Jr., making his second start, gave up two runs in four innings while Ethan Roberts gave up two runs in just 2/3 of inning of relief as the Cubs lost their third in a row 4–3. The loss dropped the Cubs under .500 for the first time on the season.
 April 22 – In a game whose start was delayed over six hours due to expected thunderstorms, the Cubs were held to two runs in a 4–2 loss to the Pirates. Drew Smyly gave up four runs in five innings in the loss, the Cubs' fourth in a row.
 April 23 – Kyle Hendricks and two relievers shut out the Pirates and the Cub offense exploded for 21 runs while hitting only one home run. Alfonso Rivas drove in five runs while three other Cubs drove in three runs in the 21–0 blowout. The Cubs had 23 hits in the game, 18 of which were singles.
 April 24 – Despite the prior days' offensive explosion, the Cubs only managed three runs and lost the third game of the series against the Pirates despite outscoring them by 15 in the series. The 4–3 loss was the Cubs' fifth loss in the prior six games.
 April 26 – After an off day, the Cubs traveled to Atlanta to face the Braves. Marcus Stroman pitched six innings while allowing only two unearned runs, but the Cubs were only able to score on an Ian Happ solo home run as they lost 3–1. The loss dropped the Cubs to three games under .500 on the season.
 April 27 –  In game two of the series against Atlanta, the Cubs jumped to an early 3–0 lead. However, the Cub bullpen surrendered the lead in the bottom of the eighth and the game went into extra innings tied at three. In the first extra inning game of the year for the Cubs, Willson Contreras drove in the starting runner from second in the top of the 10th and Patrick Wisdom hit a two-run home run to give the Cubs the 6–3 win.
 April 28 – In the final game of the series, the Cubs only mustered one run again while the Braves scored three times in the eighth to secure the 5–1 win.
 April 29 – The Cubs next travelled to Milwaukee to face the Brewers. In game one of the series, Kyle Hendricks allowed six runs in 4.1 innings as the Cubs were blow out 11–1.
 April 30 – In game two of the series, the Cubs were blown out again by the Brewers, losing 9–1. The Cubs managed only one run for the third straight game and for the fourth time in the prior five games. The loss dropped the Cubs to 8–13 on the season.

May 

 May 1 – In the finale of the series against the Brewers, Marcus Stroman threw seven scoreless innings and the Cub bullpen pitched two innings of scoreless relief as they won 2–0.
 May 3 – After an off day, the Cubs returned to Wrigley to face the Chicago White Sox. Scott Effross made the start for the Cubs and allowed two runs in 1.1 innings. The Cub bullpen allowed only one run in relief, but again the Cubs managed only one run, losing the game 3–1.
 May 4 – In the final game of the short two-game series, the Cubs took an early 3–1 lead on homers by Nico Hoerner and Patrick Wisdom, but Kyle Hendricks surrendered four runs in 5.2 innings and the Cubs lost to the White Sox 4–3. 
 May 7 – After a scheduled off day and a rainout of the first game of the series, the Cubs faced the Los Angeles Dodgers in doubleheader. In game one of the series, the Cubs were held scoreless by Clayton Kershaw and the Dodger bullpen. Drew Smyly gave up three runs in 4.1 innings while Robert Gsellman gave up five runs in 3.2 innings as the Cubs lost 7–0. In game two of the doubleheader, the Cubs were blown out again, losing 6–2. Daniel Norris got the start for the Cubs and allowed three runs in 1.1 innings in the loss.
 May 8 – In the finale of the series, the Cubs lost their fifth straight, getting blown out again 7–1. Justin Steele, making an emergency start as Marcus Stroman was placed on the IL before the game, gave up two runs in four innings, but Michael Rucker surrendered three runs in just three innings in the loss. The loss dropped the Cubs to nine games under .500 on the season.
 May 9 – The Cubs traveled to San Diego to face the Padres for a three-game series. Kyle Hendricks pitched 8.2 innings of scoreless ball as the Cubs won 6–0. Ian Happ doubled and drove in two runs in the win.
 May 10 – In game two of the series, the Padres took a 2–0 lead off of Wade Miley who made his Cub debut. Alfonso Rivas homered in the third to tie the game, but Miley allowed another run to give the Padres a 3–2 lead. The Cub bullpen surrendered two more runs as the Cubs lost 5–4.
 May 11 – In the finale of the three-game series against the Padres, Willson Contreras homered and Frank Schwindel drove in two runs, but the game remained tied in the eighth when Alfonso Rivas hit a two-run single to give the Cubs the lead. Rowan Wick pitched two scoreless innings for the save as the Cubs won 7–5.
 May 13 – After an off day, the Cubs traveled to Arizona to face the Diamondbacks. Drew Smyly allowed fours runs in six innings of work while Ildemaro Vargas drove in two runs for the Cubs. However, it was not enough as the Cubs lost 4–3.
 May 14 – Kyle Hendricks followed his stellar performance against the Padres by going 5.1 innings and allowing only one run and leaving with the game tied at one. The Cubs pushed across three runs in the top of the ninth including Yan Gomes second RBI of the night to give the Cubs the 4–2 win over the Diamondbacks.
 May 15 – Justin Steele allowed only two runs in six innings, but the Cubs were still tied entering the ninth. Fran Schwindel drove in the go-ahead run on a single and Rowan Wick pitched the ninth for the 3–2 win over the Diamondbacks.
 May 16 – Returning home to face the Pirates, Willson Contreras hit a grand slam, his 100th career homer while Wade Miley pitched seven scoreless innings as the Cubs won easily 9–0.
 May 17 – The Cubs shut out the Pirates for the second consecutive day as the Cub pitching staff allowed only five hits in the 7–0 win. Infielder Christopher Morel hit a pinch hit home run in his first major league at bat as the Cubs won easily.
 May 18 – Drew Smyly allowed three runs in 4.1 innings and the Cub offense was held in check for the first time in the series, managing only two runs in the 3–2 loss to the Pirates.
 May 19 – Marcus Stroman returned from a bout of COVID-19 to make the start for the Cubs against the Diamondbacks and allowed three runs in five innings of work. The Cubs managed only one run in the 3–1 loss.
 May 20 – In game two of the series against Arizona, Kyle Hendricks allowed four home runs and seven runs in eight innings. Each Cub relief pitcher allowed a home run as well as the D-backs hit seven on the day. The Cubs hit four homers, but it was not enough as they lost 10–6.
 May 21 – The Cubs jumped out to a 4–0 lead in the game against Arizona and held the lead until the D-backs tied it in the eighth. In the 10th, Arizona scored three runs, two unearned to take at 7–4 lead. The Cubs scored two in the bottom the of the 10th, but lost their fourth straight, 7–6. Patrick Wisdom and Frank Schwindel hit back-to-back home runs in the loss.
 May 22 – In the finale of the four-game series against the D-backs, the Cubs again jumped to an early lead, this time 3–0 on a P. J. Higgins bases-clearing triple. However, once again, the Diamondbacks rallied to tie the game and took the lead in the seventh. However, for the second consecutive game, Patrick Wisdom and Frank Schwindel hit back-to-back home runs to give the Cubs the 5–4 win. It marked the first time Cub players had hit back-to-back home runs in consecutive games since Ernie Banks and Jim Hickman did it in 1969.
 May 23 – Ian Happ hit his 14th career home run in Cincinnati as the Cubs traveled to face the Reds. Patrick Wisdom also homered for the fourth consecutive game as the Cubs beat the Reds 7–4.
 May 24 – In the second game of the series against the Reds, Frank Schwindel hit two home runs and drove in three runs. Three other Cubs drove in two runs apiece as the Cubs won easily 11–4.
 May 25 – Kyle Hendricks gave up four runs in four innings, but the Cub bullpen shut the Reds out for the rest of the game, limiting the Reds to only two more hits. However, the Cub offense could manage only three runs despite having the tying run on third in the ninth. As a result, the Cubs lost 4–3.
 May 26 – Justin Steele gave up seven runs in two innings while the Cub bullpen surrendered eight runs. Shortstop Andrelton Simmons pitched the eighth inning for the Cubs and surrendered an additional five runs as the Cubs were blown out by the Reds 20–5.
 May 28 – After an off day, the Cubs returned home to face the White Sox at Guaranteed Rate Field. Frank Schwindel hit two solo home runs and Patrick Wisdom also homered as the Cubs beat the Sox 5–1. Keegan Thompson started for the Cubs and allowed only one run in five innings.
 May 29 – In the final game of the season against the White Sox, the game remained scoreless into the seventh before the Cubs pushed across a run on a Sox error to take the 1–0 lead. Marcus Stroman held the Sox to no runs in his seven innings. However, the Sox tied it on a wild pitch in the bottom of the ninth to send the game to extra innings. Both teams scored two in the 10th, but the Cubs could only manage one run in the 11th, while the Sox pushed across two for the 5–4 win.
 May 30 – The Cubs returned to Wrigley for a doubleheader against the Brewers. In game one of the doubleheader, Matt Swarmer pitched well in his major league debut, allowing only one earned run in six innings, but Daniel Norris allowed three runs as the Cubs lost 7–6. In the second game, the Cubs could only manage one run as they lost to the Brewers 3–1.
 May 31 – In game three of the series, the Cubs fell behind 3–1, but tied it in the fourth. The Brewers again took the lead in the sixth, but the Cubs rallied again in the bottom of the sixth, scoring four runs to take a 7–6 lead. The Brewers tied the game in the seventh before Patrick Wisdom hit a solo home run in the eighth to give the Cubs the 8–7 win.

June 

 June 1 – In the final game of the series against the Brewers, the Cubs took an early 2–0 lead, but the Brewers retook the lead in the fifth. The Cubs tied it on an RBI-single by Willson Contreras in the fifth, but the game went to extra innings. In the 10th, Christopher Morel hit a sacrifice fly to drive in the winning run as the Cubs won 4–3.
 June 2 – The Cubs welcomed the St. Louis Cardinals to Wrigley for a four-game series. Keegan Thompson started for the Cubs and pitched 5.1 innings while allowing three runs. Willson Contreras, Ian Happ, and Frank Schwindel homered for the Cubs as they held on for a 7–5 win.
 June 3 – In game two of the series against the Cardinals, Marcus Stroman surrendered nine runs in four innings while the Cub bullpen surrendered an additional five runs as the Cubs were blown out 14–5.
 June 4 – In game one of a doubleheader with the Cardinals, Matt Swarmer again pitched well for the Cubs, pitching six innings and allowing only one run. Frank Schwindel homered and drove in two runs while Ian Happ also drove in two as the Cubs won 6–1. In game two of the doubleheader, top pitching prospect Caleb Kilian allowed three runs in five innings of work. The Cubs were able to tie it in the sixth, but Michael Rucker surrendered four runs in the 10th and the Cubs lost 7–4.
 June 5 – In the final game of the five-game series against the Cardinals, the Cubs again were able to force extra innings. But, once again the Cub bullpen struggled in extras, allowing two runs as the Cubs lost 5–3.
 June 7 – After an off day, the Cubs visited the Orioles in Baltimore. Christopher Morel homered on the first pitch of the game, extending his streak of reaching base safely in his first 21 games of his career which also extended his Cubs' record. However, it was all downhill after that. Keegan Thompson surrendered seven runs in three innings and Alec Mills, making his season debut, allowed two runs in five innings of relief as the Cubs were blown out 9–3.
 June 10 – After a rainout and a scheduled off day, the Cubs traveled to New York to face the Yankees. The game stayed tied at one until the 13th when the Yankees scored a run to knock off the Cubs 2–1.
 June 11 – In game two of the series against the Yankees, Matt Swarmer gave up six solo home runs, including one by former Cub Anthony Rizzo as the Cubs were blown out 8–0.
 June 12 – In the final game of the series against the Yankees, five Cub pitchers gave up at least two runs while Frank Schwindel only allowed one run in one inning of work on the mound as the Cubs were blown out again 18–4.. The loss was the Cubs sixth loss in a row.
 June 13 – Opening a four-game series against the Padres at Wrigley, the Cubs lost their seventh game in a row as former Cub Yu Darvish pitched well for the Padres in the 4–1 loss.
 June 14 – Kyle Hendricks allowed one run in five plus innings, but the Cub bullpen surrendered 11 runs as the Padres won easily 12–5.
 June 15 – The Cubs were thrashed again by the Padres, losing 19–5 in game three of the series. The loss was the Cubs ninth straight.
 June 16 – In the finale of the four-game series against the Padres, Matt Swarmer allowed four runs in 3.2 innings as the Cubs lost their 10th straight game, 6–4.
 June 17 – Riding a 10-game losing streak, the Braves, who had won 14 in a row, next visited Wrigley Field. The Cubs became the first team in 23 years to stop a losing streak of 10 or more while ending the opponents winning streak of 10 or more by beating the Braves 1–0. Keegan Thompson and three relievers combined to allow only two hits in the win.
 June 18 – Willson Contreras, playing in a game against his brother, William Contreras, for the first time, had three hits while Jonathan Villar drove in two runs as the Cubs won their second straight game, beating the Braves 6–3.
 June 19 – In the finale of the three-game series against the Braves, Kyle Hendricks allowed six runs in 4.1 innings as the Cubs were shut out 6–0.
 June 20 – The Cubs next visited the Pirates for a four-game series. In the first game, Caleb Kilian allowed seven runs in 2.1 innings while Alec Mills, making his season debut, allowed five runs in 4.1 innings as the Cubs were blown out 12–1.
 June 21 – In game two of the series against the Pirates, Matt Swarmer allowed five runs in four innings and the Cubs lost their third in a row, 7–1. 
 June 22 – Patrick Wisdom homered and drove in four runs while Alfonso Rivas homered and drove in five runs as the Cubs routed the Pirates 14–5.
 June 23 – In the finale of the series against the Pirates, the Cubs trailed 6–2, but scored five runs in the eighth to take a 7–6 lead. However, David Roberston allowed a homer in the bottom of the eighth and, in extra innings, Scott Effross allowed a run as the Cubs lost 8–7.
 June 24 – The Cubs next travelled to face the Cardinals in St. Louis. After losing four of their previous five games, Kyle Hendricks pitched 7.1 innings of shutout baseball while Nico Hoerner homered and drove in two. The Cub bullpen pitched 1.2 innings of perfect baseball to give the Cubs the 3–0 win.
 June 25 – The Cubs trailed for the majority of the game, but scored two runs in the eighth to tie it. However, the Cub bullpen quickly surrendered the lead in the bottom half of the eight as the Cubs lost to the Cardinals 5–3.
 June 26 – In the finale of the three-game series against the Cardinals, the Cubs fell behind by five as the Cardinals hit three solo homers in the third. However, in the fourth, the Cubs rallied to tie the game at five as Rafael Ortega and Willson Contreras drove in two runs each. In the 10th, Contreras drove in a run David Robertson finished out the game for the 6–5 win.
 June 28 – After an off day, the Cubs returned home to face the Reds for a three-game series. Keegan Thompson pitched well for six innings, but surrendered three runs in the seventh as the Cubs lost 5–3.
 June 29 – Justin Steele allowed only one run in five-plus innings and Willson Contreras and Christopher Morel homered as the Cubs beat the Reds easily 8–3.
 June 30 – Patrick Wisdom hit a grand slam and drove in six runs as the Cubs won 15–7 against the Reds. Christopher morel had five hits in the easy win.

July 

 July 1 – With the Red Sox visiting Wrigley for the first time since 2012, the Cubs trailed early, but scored three in the fifth and another three in the sixth to take the 6–5 lead. The Cub bullpen shut out the Sox as the Cubs held on for the win, their third straight.
 July 2 – In game two of the series against the Red Sox, Alec Mills left with a back injury after facing just two batters. Mark Leiter pitched well in relief, allowing only one run in 5.1 innings. David Robertson secured the win a four-out save as the Cubs won 3–1.
 July 3 – In the finale of the three-game series against the Red Sox, Patrick Wisdom hit a home run in the bottom of the eighth to tie the game at two. However, the Red Sox scored twice in the 11th as the Cubs lost 4–2.
 July 4 – On Independence Day, the Cubs traveled to Milwaukee to face the Brewers. Tied at one in the top of the ninth, Seiya Suzuki, in his first game since May 20, hit an inside-the-park home run to give the Cubs the 2–1 lead. David Robertson walked in the tying run in the bottom of the ninth to force extra innings. Former Cub Víctor Caratini, who has struck out in all four previous plate appearances, hit a three-run homer in the bottom of the 10th to give the Brewers the 5–2 win.
 July 5 – In game two of the series, Seiya Suzuki homered again and drove in three runs as the Cubs beat the Brewers 8–3. Kyle Hendricks left the game after three innings with a sore shoulder, but the Cub bullpen surrendered only one run in six innings of relief.
 July 6 – Trailing 1–0 in the eighth, Rafael Ortega drove in the tying run and PJ Higgins doubled in the go-ahead run in the ninth as the Cubs came from behind to beat the Brewers 2–1.
 July 7 – Traveling to Los Angeles to face the Dodgers, Mark Leiter Jr. allowed four runs in five innings while Christopher Morel homered and Seiya Suzuki drove in a run, but it was not enough as the Cubs lost 5–3.
 July 8 – Keegan Thompson allowed only one run, an unearned run, in 5.2 innings, and the Cubs led 3–2 going into the bottom of the ninth. But, David Robertson walked in the tying run to send the game to extra innings and Rowan Wick allowed a run in the bottom of the 10th as the Cubs lost to the Dodgers 4–3.
 July 9 – Marcus Stroman returned from the injured list, and pitched four innings without allowing a run, The Cubs scored two runs off Dodger starter Clayton Kershaw, but Rowan Wickk allowed three runs in the seventh as the Cubs lost again 4–2.
 July 10 – PJ Higgins hit a grand slam in the first inning and the Cubs jumped out to 5–0 and 8–3 leads, but the Cubs' pitching allowed 11 runs as the Dodgers won 11–9 to complete the sweep.
 July 12 – After an off day, the Cubs returned home to face the Baltimore Orioles. The Cubs again took an early lead, but could manage only two runs as they lost 4–2. The loss marked their fifth straight.
 July 13 –  Justin Steele allowed three earned runs in six innings, but the Cubs managed only one run against the Orioles. the Cub bullpen allowed three more runs as the Cubs lost 7–1.
 July 14 – With the first-place New York Mets in town, Keegan Thompson allowed five runs in 4.1 innings as the Cubs were shut out 8–0, marking their seventh straight loss.
 July 16 – After a rainout the previous day, the Cubs faced the Mets in a doubleheader. In the first game, the game went to extra innings tied at one. Neither team scored in the 10th before Pete Alonso hit a sacrifice fly to give the Mets the 2–1 victory. In game two of the doubleheader, the game again went to extras. The Mets scored two in the 10th off Michael Givens and the Cubs could manage only one run in the bottom half to fall again, 4–3. The loss marked the Cubs ninth straight loss.
 July 17 – In the finale of the first half, the Cubs trailed 2–1 before Ian Happ drove in a run on a groundout in the eighth. Two batters later, Nico Hoerner drove in the go-ahead run on a single. David Robertson pitched the ninth to earn his 13th save of the season as the Cubs ended their nine-game losing streak with a 3–2 win over the Mets. The Cubs entered the All-Star break with a 35–57 record.
 July 22 – After the All-Star break, the Cubs traveled to Philadelphia to face the Phillies for a three-game series. Nelson Velasquez hit two home runs and drove in five runs while Willson Contreras and Seiya Suzuki also homered as the Cubs routed the Phillies 15–2.
 July 23 – In game two of the series against the Phillies, the game went to extra innings tied at one. In the 10th, the Cubs scored five runs helped by a throwing error by the Phillies and won 6–2.
 July 24 – In the finale of the three-game series, Yan Gomes hit two home runs and the Cubs held on to win 4–3 to sweep the Phillies.
 July 25 – The Cubs returned home to face the Pirates in Chicago. Adrian Sampson allowed two runs in seven innings of work while Nico Hoerner drove in two runs as the Cubs won 3–2.
 July 26 – In the second game of the series and the final home game before the trade deadline, Ian Happ drove in two runs while Willson Contreras doubled as the Cubs beat the Pirates 4–2 marking their sixth straight win. The game may have been the final home game for Contreras and Happ who were rumored to be traded by the trade deadline.
 July 28 – After an off day, the Cubs traveled to San Francisco to face the Giants. The Cubs were held without a hit until the seventh and managed only two runs as they lost 4–2, ending their six-game winning streak.
 July 29 – In game two of the series, Patrick Wisdom hit a homer for the second consecutive game and Marcus Stroman pitched six scoreless innings as the Cubs beat the Giants 4–2.
 July 30 – Drew Smyly allowed five runs in four innings and the Cubs trailed 5–1 entering the ninth. The Cubs pushed across three runs in the top of the ninth, but could not tie the game as they lost to the Giants 5–4.
 July 31 – In the finale of the four-game series against the Giants and the final game before the trade deadline, the Cubs managed only four hits and were shut out by the Giants 4–0.

August 

 August 2 – After an off day, the Cubs traveled to face the Cardinals. In the first game after the trade deadline, Willson Contreras, who was not traded, tripled in his second at bat and reached base two other times after being hit by pitches. Keegan Thompson allowed five runs on 10 hits as the Cubs were shut out 6–0.
 August 4 – Following a rainout, the Cubs took on the Cardinals in a doubleheader. In game one, The Cubs led until the seventh, when Marcus Stroman surrendered three runs to tie the game in at three. In the bottom of the ninth, the Cardinals pushed across the winning run to win 4–3. In the second game, the Cubs were limited to only two runs by newly-acquired (and former Cub) José Quintana and lost to the Cardinals 7–2.
 August 5 – The Cubs returned home to face the Miami Marlins at Wrigley. Willson Contreras hit a two-run homer in the bottom of the eighth and Rowan Wick pitched 1.1 innings to earn the win as the Cubs won 2–1.
 August 6 – In the second game of the series against the Marlins, Nico Hoerner had three hits and drove in a run as the Cubs beat the Marlins 4–0. Drew Smyly pitched 6.2 scoreless innings while Mark Leiter Jr. pitched 2.1 perfect innings of relief.
 August 7 – In the finale of the series against the Marlins, the Cubs were shut out 3–0. Adrian Sampson allowed three runs in six innings, but the Cub offense was held to only two hits in the loss.
 August 8 – The Cubs next faced the Nationals at Wrigley. Keegan Thompson pitched six innings while allowing only one run in the game. Nelson Velasquez and Christopher Morel homered for the Cubs as they won 6–3.
 August 9 – Trailing 4–1 in the seventh, the Cubs rallied to take the lead on singles by Rafael Ortega, Willson Contreras, newly-acquired Franmil Reyes, and Nico Hoerner. However, Mark Leiter Jr. allowed a two-run homer in the eighth as the Cubs lost to the Nationals 6–5.
 August 10 – The Cubs again scored four in the seventh inning after trailing the Nationals, but the bullpen held on to the lead as the Cubs won 4–2.
 August 11 – The Cubs next traveled to Dyersville, Iowa to play the Reds in the Field of Dreams game. Drew Smyly pitched five scoreless innings and the Cubs took an early 3–0 lead. The Cub bullpen was able to hold the lead as the Cubs won 4–2.
 August 13 – After an off day, the Cubs returned to Cincinnati to finish the series against the Reds. Willson Contreras, Rafael Ortega, and Ian Happ homered for the Cubs as the won easily 7–2.
 August 14 – In the finale of the series against the Reds, Keegan Thompson allowed four runs in 1.2 innings and the Cub bullpen surrendered four more as they lost 8–5.
 August 15 – The Cubs travelled to Washington to face the Nationals. Marcus Stroman allowed four runs in 4.2 innings, but the Cubs tied the game in the seventh on a Seiya Suzuki single. However, Brandon Hughes allowed a homer in the eighth as the Cubs lost 5–4.
 August 16 – Justin Steele allowed one unearned run in six innings, but the Cub bullpen surrendered a 4–1 lead and the game went to extra innings. Both teams scored a run in the 10th before Patrick Wisdom doubled to score a run in the 11th and Seiya Suzuki singled in another run as the Cubs won 7–5 over the Nationals.
 August 17 – With the game tied at two in the seventh, Yan Gomes drove in the go-ahead run and Rowan Wick pitched a perfect ninth for the save as the Cubs beat the Nationals 3–2.
 August 18 – In a makeup game of an earlier rainout, the Cubs travelled to Baltimore to face the Orioles. Adrian Sampson pitched 5.2 scoreless innings while Willson Contreras homered twice to give the Cubs the 3–2 win.
 August 19 – The Cubs then returned home for a three-game series with the Brewers. Patrick Wisdom hit a two-run homer, but the Cubs still trailed in the sixth. Christopher Morel hit a two-run homer in the sixth to give the Cubs the 7–6 win, their fourth win in a row.
 August 20 – Rowan Wick allowed a two-run homer in the eighth to put the Cubs behind 3–2. In the ninth, Nick Madrigal singled to tie the game at three and force extra innings. Both teams scored in the 10th. After the Brewers pushed the lead to 5–4 in the 11th, Patrick Wisdom doubled in the tying run and Willson Contreras singled to give the Cubs the 6–5 win.
 August 21 – The Cubs took an early lead on home runs by Ian Happ, his 100th career homer, and Seiya Suzuki. However, the Cub bullpen surrendered five runs after Justin Steele had pitched six scoreless innings and the Cubs lost to the Brewers 5–2.
 August 22 – Beginning a five-game series against the Cardinals at Wrigley, the Cubs were shut out 1–0. Drew Smyly allowed only one run in seven innings in the loss.
 August 23 – In game on of a doubleheader with the Cardinals, newly called-up Javier Assad got the start for the Cubs and pitched four innings without allowing a run. The Cub bullpen combined for five innings of scoreless baseball as the Cubs won 2–0. In game two of the doubleheader, the Cubs were blown out by the Cardinals 13–3.
 August 24 – In the fourth game of the series, Luke Farrell got the start and pitched four scoreless innings while Zach McKinstry homered and drove in three runs as the Cubs won 7–1.
 August 25 – In the finale of the series against the Cardinals, Marcus Stroman allowed five runs and 11 hits in five innings as the Cardinals won 8–3.
 August 26 – The Cubs next faced the Brewers in Milwaukee. Ian Happ hit two two-run home runs, accounting for the only Cub hits in the game, as the Cubs beat the Brewers 4–3 in 10 innings.
 August 27 – In game two, the Cubs were shut out by the Brewers 7–0 despite Drew Smyly pitching six scoreless innings.
 August 28 – In the season finale against the Brewers, the Cubs again received good starting pitching as Adrian Sampson allowed only one run in 3.1 innings. However, the Cub bullpen surrendered eight runs and the Cubs lost 9–7.
 August 29 – The Cubs next travelled to Toronto to face the Blue Jays. Javier Assad again pitched well, throwing five scoreless innings and left with a 4–0. However, the Cub bullpen quickly surrendered the lead and the game went to extras, tied at four. After neither team scored in the 10th, Danny Jansen homered in the 11th to give the Blue Jays the 5–4 win.
 August 30 – Marcus Stroman allowed only one run in five innings, but the Cub bullpen again struggled, allowing four runs as the Cubs lost 5–3. Willson Contreras and Christopher Morel homered for the Cubs in the loss.
 August 31 – In game three of the series against the Blue Jays, the Cubs jumped to an early 5–0 lead and held  on for the 7–5 win.

September 

 September 2 – After an off day, the Cubs played the Cardinals in St. Louis. Adrian Sampson allowed two runs in five innings, but reliever Sean Newcomb allowed five runs in the seventh and eighth as the Cubs were shutout 8–0.
 September 3 – Drew Smyly allowed seven runs in 2.1 innings as the Cubs again lost to the Cardinals 8–4.
 September 4 – In the finale of the season series against the Cardinals, Marcus Stroman pitched seven scoreless innings, but the Cubs were again shutout, losing 2–0.
 September 6 – After another off day, Hayden Wesneski, acquired from the Yankees at the trade deadline, made his major league debut, pitching five innings of shutout ball in relief of Wade Miley to earn the win. Seiya Suzuki drove in three runs in the 9–3 win over the Reds at Wrigley.
 September 7 – Javier Assad allowed four runs in 5.1 innings and the Cubs managed only one run as they lost to the Reds 7–1.
 September 8 – In the finale of the series, the Cubs took a 3–2 lead in the eighth on a Seiya Suzuki homer. However, the Reds scored two runs in the ninth to win the game 4–3.
 September 9 – The Giants next came to Wrigley Field and Drew Smyly allowed only one run in seven innings of work. Yan Gomes and Nico Hoerner each hit two-run homers as the Cubs won 4–2.
 September 10 – Marcus Stroman allowed four runs in four innings while the Cubs lost to the Giants 5–2.
 September 11 – In the finale of the season series against the Giants, Heyden Wesneski allowed three runs in 3.2 innings of relief to earn his first loss. Seiya Suzuki homered for the Cubs in the 4–2 loss.
 September 12 – The Cubs returned to the road to face the NL East-leading Mets. Javier Assad allowed only one run in six innings to earn his first win while Rafael Ortega and Zach McKinstry homered in the 5–2 win.
 September 13 – Adrian Sampson pitched six scoreless innings and the Cub bullpen allowed only one run as the Cubs beat the Mets again 4–1. Ian Happ and David Bote homered for the Cubs in the win.
 September 14 – The Cubs completed the three-game sweep against the Mets as they scored six runs in the first inning. Drew Smyly allowed two runs in five innings as the Cubs won 6–3.
 September 16 – After an off day, the Cubs returned home to face the Rockies. Marcus Stroman earned his first win at Wrigley, allowing only one run in seven innings. The Cubs held on for the 2–1 win.
 September 17 – Heyden Wesneski pitched seven innings and allowed only one run and left with the game tied at one. Adbert Alzolay, making his season debut, allowed two runs in two innings as the Cubs lost to the Rockies 3–1. The Cubs were officially eliminated from playoff competition with the loss.
 September 18 – Javier Assad allowed four runs in two innings as the Cubs lost to the Rockies 4–3.
 September 19 – The Cubs returned to the road to face the Marlins in Miami. Wade Miley allowed seven runs in three innings as the Cubs were blown out 10–3.
 September 20 – David Bote drove in two runs with a homer and a sacrifice fly while Adrian Sampson allowed only one run in six innings. The Cub bullpen held the Marlins scoreless as the Cubs won 2–1.
 September 21 – Trailing the Marlins 3–0 in the seventh, Patrick Wisdom homered to draw the game within two. The Cubs tied it in the eighth and Ian Happ's sacrifice fly gave the Cubs a 4–3 win. Keegan Thompson pitched three innings of scoreless relief to earn the win.
 September 22 – Hayden Wisneski pitched 6.1 innings and allowed only two runs as the Cubs faced the Pirates in Pittsburgh. Christopher Morel drove in two runs as the Cubs won 3–2.
 September 23 – Patrick Wisdom homered and drove in two runs while newly-called up infielder Esteban Quiroz drove in two runs including the go-ahead run in the eighth as the Cubs beat the Pirates 6–5.
 September 24 – Wade Miley allowed three runs in four innings while Adbert Alzolay allowed three in three innings as the Cubs were shut out by the Pirates 6–0.
 September 25 – In the finale of the season series with the Pirates, Adrian Sampson allowed only one run in six innings while Patrick Wisdom hit his 25th homer of the season and drove in three runs as the Cubs won 8–3.
 September 27 – After an off day, the Cubs returned home for their final homestand of the season. Facing the Phillies who were in the wild card hunt, Marcus Stroman allowed one run in four innings while the Cub bullpen shut out the Phillies. Christopher Morel homered and Yan Gomes drove in the go-ahead run in the seventh as the Cubs won 2–1.
 September 28 – Hayden Wisneski allowed only one run in five innings and Christopher Morel hit a three-run homer as the Cubs beat the Phillies 4–2.
 September 29 – In the season finale against the Phillies, Javier Assad pitched five scoreless innings as the Cubs shut out the Phillies 2–0 to sweep the season series.
 September 30 – In the final home series of the season Adrian Sampson continued to pitch well, allowing only one run in seven innings while Nico Hoerner drove in three runs. The 6–1 win marked the Cubs' fifth win in a row and their ninth win in their last 10 games.

October 

 October 1 – Seiya Suzuki homered to give the Cubs the lead in the seventh while the Cub bullpen held the Reds without a run as the Cubs won their sixth straight, 2–1.
 October 2 – In the final game of the season at Wrigley Field, Willson Contreras, playing perhaps his last home game at Wrigley, received several standing ovations. Marcus Stroman earned his second straight win by throwing six scoreless innings while Nelson Velasquez drove in four runs as the Cubs won 8–1.
 October 3 – In the final series of the year, the Cubs managed only two hits as they lost to the Red in Cincinnati 3–1. The loss ended the Cubs' seven-game winning streak.
 October 4 – Leading 2–0 in the seventh, the Reds hit a two-run homer off of Keegan Thompson and pushed across the winning run in the ninth off of Brandon Hughes. The 3–2 loss was the second straight for the Cubs.
 October 5 – In the season finale, the Cubs blew out the Reds 15–2 marking the Reds' 100th loss of the season. David Bote homered and drove in five runs in the win as the Cubs finished the season 74–88. The Cubs had a promising 39-31 record for the second half of the season despite having a 35-57 record at the All Star break.

Transactions

April 

Source

May

Source

June 

Source

July 

Source

August 

Source

September 

Source

Roster

Statistics

Batting 
(final statistics)
Note: G = Games played; AB = At bats; R = Runs; H = Hits; 2B = Doubles; 3B = Triples; HR = Home runs; RBI = Runs batted in; SB = Stolen bases; BB = Walks; K = Strikeouts; AVG = Batting average; OBP = On-base percentage; SLG = Slugging percentage; TB = Total bases

Source

Pitching 
(final statistics)
Note: W = Wins; L = Losses; ERA = Earned run average; G = Games pitched; GS = Games started; SV = Saves; IP = Innings pitched; H = Hits allowed; R = Runs allowed; ER = Earned runs allowed; BB = Walks allowed; K = Strikeouts

Source

Farm system 

First baseman Matt Mervis, who led the minor leagues in RBIs and was third with 36 home runs,  was named the Cubs 2022 Minor League Player of the Year.

In 2022, the Cubs managers in their farm system were as follows.

References

External links 
Chicago Cubs 2022 Schedule at MLB.com
2022 Chicago Cubs at ESPN
2022 Chicago Cubs season at Baseball Reference

Chicago Cubs
Cubs
Cubs
Chicago Cubs seasons